Zakhmi Dil is an Indian Punjabi movie released 1981.Stars Dharmendra, Sujit Kumar, Dara Singh, Veerendra, and Mala Jaggi in Original title Giddha. The film was later dubbed in Hindi as Zakhmi Dil.

Cast
Dharmendra
Dara Singh
Daljit Kaur
Navin Nischol

Crew
Music Director: Ved Pal
Lyrics: Mahinder Dehlvi
Playback: Dilraj Kaur, Savita and Asha Bhonsle
Producer: Ruplal Sanger
Director: B.S. Shaad

References

External links
 
 

Punjabi-language Indian films
1980s Punjabi-language films
1981 films